Barbara Bailey Kennelly (born Barbara Ann Bailey; born July 10, 1936) is an American politician. She is the former Democratic member of the United States House of Representatives from Connecticut.

Family and Education
Kennelly was born Barbara Ann Bailey in Hartford, Connecticut on July 10, 1936. Her father was long-time Democratic Party leader John M. Bailey.

Kennelly studied at St. Joseph Cathedral School and graduated from Mount St. Joseph Academy in West Hartford in 1954. She earned a B.A. from Trinity College in Washington, D.C. (now Trinity Washington University) in 1958 and a certificate from the Harvard-Radcliffe Program in Business Administration in 1959. In 1971, she earned a master's degree from Trinity College in Connecticut.

Kennelly was married to the late James J. Kennelly, an attorney who served as Speaker of the Connecticut House of Representatives from 1975 to 1979. She has three daughters, one son, and twelve grandchildren.

Career
In 1975, Kennelly was elected to the Hartford Court of Common Council, a position she held until 1979.  She served as the Secretary of the State of Connecticut from 1979 until 1982.

Kennelly was elected to Congress in a special election to fill the vacancy caused by the death of William R. Cotter. She represented Connecticut's First Congressional District in the United States House of Representatives for eight terms, from January 12, 1982 until January 3, 1999. During the 98th Congress, Kennelly was appointed to the Ways and Means Committee. She served on the Subcommittees on Human Resources and Select Revenue Measures. Beginning in 1987, she served on the Permanent Select Committee on Intelligence. During the 103rd Congress, Kennelly became Vice-Chair of the Democratic Caucus.

She did not seek re-election in 1998, running instead for Governor of Connecticut against Republican incumbent John G. Rowland, to whom she lost.

In 1999, President Bill Clinton appointed her Associate Commissioner and Counselor to the Commissioner at the Social Security Administration. She later worked at the law firm Baker & Hostetler. From 2002 to 2011, she served as President of the National Committee to Preserve Social Security and Medicare. In 2006, Nancy Pelosi appointed her to the Social Security Advisory Board. In 2011, Kennelly accepted a position at her alma mater, Trinity Washington University, as a distinguished professor of political science.

As of 2015, Kennelly is a member of the board of the  International Foundation for Electoral Systems, a non-profit that provides assistance with elections in many countries. She is the president of the United States Association of Former Members of Congress.

The Barbara B. Kennelly Post Office Building in Hartford is named in her honor.

See also
Women in the United States House of Representatives

References

External links

 Barbara Kennelly in Connecticut Women's Hall of Fame
 Barbara Kennelly Papers Archives & Special Collections, Thomas J. Dodd Research Center, University of Connecticut
 

|-

|-

|-

|-

|-

1936 births
Living people
21st-century American women
Connecticut city council members
Democratic Party members of the United States House of Representatives from Connecticut
Female members of the United States House of Representatives
Democratic Party members of the Connecticut House of Representatives
People associated with BakerHostetler
Politicians from Hartford, Connecticut
Secretaries of the State of Connecticut
Trinity College (Connecticut) alumni
Trinity Washington University alumni
Women state legislators in Connecticut
Women city councillors in Connecticut
Women in Connecticut politics
Members of Congress who became lobbyists